The Colegio Cristo Rey is a Jesuit elementary and secondary school located in the city of Asunción, Paraguay. It was founded in 1938.

History

 1938  The primary school opened with the first three grades and about 400 students.
 1952  High school opens with first year, increasing to six years by 1957. There were also classes in commerce. Technical Radio run by the Jesuits opened this same year. Catechetical classes were initiated to prepare religion teachers for state schools.
1953  "La Voz del Colegio" first appeared, in mimeographed form.
 1954  Technical classes in radio were initiated, and in 1958 moved to Javier Technical College.
 1958  "Ediciones Loyola" begins printing textbooks for primary and secondary schools, in mimeographed form. 
 1962 - 1970 Construction of new school building. 
 1968  The college has 515 secondary students, 610 primary pupils, 265 tech students, 168 in religious ed.
  1967 Courses in adult literacy are created, the equivalent of 1st to 6th grade especially for the working class and maids; clerks also attended.
 1972 Coeducation  begins. Club work included photography, theater, music, and other activities such as camping and days of reflection. The new building for the pre-school is built.
 1974 By this year 535 students had completed bachelors studies.
 1975 The magazine "Education 75" offers information, guidance, help, and avenues for understanding the problems of education in general. A student canteen is built. 
 1976 The college is operated by the government, until 1977. 
 1983 The first co-ed graduation, with 23 girls among 100 graduates. 
 1987 Association of Parents (APAC), Association of Teachers (OPAS), Association of Administrative Officials (ASEA), Student Council, and Association of Alumni are now active. There are clubs at the secondary level in the areas of natural sciences, physics, mathematics, music, dance, chess, and theatre. There is also a Department of Educational Research in which students learn the basics of scientific research and help the school with surveys and tests.
1988  Enrollment at primary and secondary level together is 1927 students. A student council is formed to represent the students. Jesuit Father General Peter Hans Kolvenbach visits and dedicates a monument on the grounds to the memory of San Roque González de Santa Cruz, first Paraguayan saint, San Juan del Castillo, and San Alonso Rodriguez, Caaró martyrs who were newly canonized. New science labs and rooms for music and fine arts are added. To accommodate live music and ballet, the Living Theatre College is remodeled. Among the 20 high school clubs are choir, speech, and drama.
 1989 The Ministry of Education makes Cristo Rey College head of the Educational Core which includes 14 private schools. Fulfilling that task, the College organizes training sessions for teachers on Education for Democratic Life, Workshop for Teachers Guide, and Math Workshop.
 1992 The first bachelors class of Scientific and Humanistic Educational Innovation Plan graduates. it is well integrated into university life and various careers.
 1993 Hall Center for children with Down syndrome is opened on the campus of the college. It includes specialized services in pediatric neurology, clinics, speech therapy, and educational psychology.  Center for Children and Youth is aimed at students with special educational needs. Secondary students have service trips to Pa'i Puku College in the Paraguayan Chaco; also working in the Fe y Alegria San Cayetano School in South Bathed in Asuncion. Also the Jesuit documents "Ignatian Pedagogical Paradigm" and "Characteristics of Education of the Society of Jesus" are studied by the faculty in an intensive workshop and in monthly seminars throughout the school year.
1994 A roofed gymnasium/auditorium is added for handball, volleyball, mini basketball, futsal, cestoball, and gymnastics, along with singing, music, and dance festivals and large assemblies. A student exchange program with the Ursulines of Dallas, Texas, and Mateo Ricci Preparatory School in Seattle, Washington. A group of 10 to 15 students travels to the US for eight weeks between January and February and a group of American students comes to Cristo Rey in June and July. Secondary education has four sections in each year, leading to the bachillerato, with emphasis in social sciences, school science with emphasis in basic sciences and technology, and technical bachelor of business administration. Physical education classes include handball, volleyball, basketball, football, and basketball.

News bits
 2011 The girls of the college were involved in the FIFA football initiative.
 2015 The financing of education had become a major issue: students from Cristo Rey College organize a national assembly with students from other schools and the National Union of Students of Paraguay Centers (UNEPY) in attendance. As a part of the Ignatian Works for Haiti international campaign, students in the primary school portrayed their solidarity with the Haitian youth through childlike drawings. On 11 July 2015 Pope Francis spoke at Cristo Rey College as a part of his Latin American tour.
 2016  The college hosts national sports competitions for primary school students. The teaching method of Jesuit schools in Paraguay, drawing on the experience in Spain, seeks to evolve to an educational model that eliminates courses, exams, and schedules and revolutionizes teaching. In addition to Cristo Rey College, the new model will be implemented in three other schools in Paraguay, as well as in the network of centers called Fe y Alegría, located in the poorest neighborhoods of the Paraguayan capital.

Notable alumni

Alumni of the College include the president of Paraguay, Horacio Cartes, the mayor of Asunción Mario Ferreiro, and filmmaker Juan Carlos Maneglia, among other prominent figures.

See also

 Catholic Church in Paraguay
 Education in Paraguay
 List of Jesuit schools

References 

Jesuit secondary schools in Paraguay
Jesuit primary schools in Paraguay
Schools in Asunción
Educational institutions established in 1938
1938 establishments in Paraguay